Landing Creek is an  tributary of the Mullica River in southern New Jersey in the United States.  The creek originates near Egg Harbor City and joins the Mullica River just below Lower Bank near Hog Islands.  It is joined along its route by Union Creek, Elliots Creek, Indian Cabin Creek, and Rubins Run, in that order.

For much of its length, Landing Creek has a typical Pine Barrens character to it as it runs through upland forests of Oak and Pitch Pine with periodic passes through cedar and maple swamps.  Downstream from Clarks Landing Road, the stream becomes tidal and infiltrated by brackish water.  For these last few miles of its stretch, Landing Creek widens and passes through an extensive marshland which is characteristic of the Mullica River estuary. As late as 1921, Gloucester Lake was located on Landing Creek.

See also
List of rivers of New Jersey

References

Rivers of Atlantic County, New Jersey
Tributaries of the Mullica River
Rivers in the Pine Barrens (New Jersey)
Rivers of New Jersey